State Road 594 (NM 594) was a state highway in the US state of New Mexico. The 2010 NMDOT Highway Log showed NM 594 having a southern terminus is at NM 599 by Santa Fe, and a northern terminus was at NM 4 by White Rock with a length of 1 mile, but the straight-line distance between the two locations is roughly 12 miles. Then the 2016 NMDOT Highway Log didn't include a NM 594 designation in the list.

Future
With no Rio Grande crossing in the area, the NM 594 designation seemed to be a placeholder for a future route planned as a direct route between Santa Fe and Los Alamos.

See also

References

594
Transportation in Santa Fe County, New Mexico